Fraticelli may refer to:

 Fraticelli (surname), Italian surname
 Fraticelli, spiritual Franciscans
 Fraticelli of Monte Malbe, religious order from the 14th century